Caribbean Airlines operates scheduled services to the following destinations:

List

References

Lists of airline destinations
Caribbean Airlines